Bingo Industries is an Australian waste management and recycling company founded by the Tartak family in 2005. With Headquarters in Sydney, Australia and network across Melbourne, Australia the Company operates residential and commercial waste services, recycling services and bin manufacturing through subsidiary company TORO Waste Equipment  Its origins were formed in 2005 when Tony Tartak purchased a small skip bin company.

The company was floated on the Australian Securities Exchange in 2017, becoming a public company with a launch share price of $1.85, earning its founders around $452 million whilst retaining a 30 percent stake. Prior to its float, it held a 24 percent share in the building and demolition waste market. 

In 2018, Bingo Industries acquired Dial A Dump for $578 million. The transaction was approved by the Australian Competition & Consumer Commission in February 2019. In April 2021, Bingo Industries was purchased by Macquarie Group.

In October 2022 the former CEO of Bingo Industries, Daniel Tartak, pleaded guilty to criminal cartel offences over price fixing in Sydney in 2019.

References

External links

Australian companies established in 2005
Companies formerly listed on the Australian Securities Exchange
Companies based in Sydney
Waste companies established in 2005
Waste management companies of Australia